Raymond Procter (born 9 March 1938) is a New Zealand former cricketer. He played six first-class matches for Otago in 1960/61.

See also
 List of Otago representative cricketers

References

External links
 

1938 births
Living people
New Zealand cricketers
Otago cricketers
Cricketers from Dunedin